Alara is the royal title of the king of Ilara-Mokin land in Nigeria. The Alara may be addressed as Oba, like rulers in other Yoruba kingdoms, or as His Royal Majesty. Alara is also known to be unquestionable, with an authority that is said to be next to the gods.

History
The first Alárá of Ilara-Mokin was Ọbalúfọ̀n Modulua Olutipin, who was also known as Obalufon Alayemore (some sources identify the Ọbàlùfọ̀n here as Obalufon Ogbogbodirin. According to oral history, Ọbàlùfọ̀n fled from Ilé-Ìfẹ̀ called Ará (meaning family or relative) (hence why Ilara is named Ilara, "The one who has many relatives") along with other people and fellow leaders such as Ajígun Ọlọ́fin after being deposed by Oranmiyan. There, Ọbalufon established many settlements and towns in what is now the Ekiti region. Among those towns were Ìlárá. Upon Obalufon's departure, he placed his son Àyájọ́ on the throne as the second Alárá.

The name Alárá comes from the phrase, "oní ará," meaning, "The leader of the family," referring to the original place where the people of Ìlárá-Mọ̀kín originated from. Kings of other towns in the Ekiti and surrounding regions also founded by Ọbalufon also use the title Alárá, such as Alárá of Arámọkọ-Èkìtì, Alárá of Ará (in Osun State).

Because Ilara-Mokin was a part of the Akure Kingdom, the Alara answered to the Déjì of Akure and had to pay homage, tribute, and was not permitted to wear a crown. He was regarded as a, "baálẹ̀." This continued into the absorption of Ilara into Colonial Nigeria. When Nigeria gained independence, the Alara was elevated to a monarch (Ọba), and beginning with Alara Ojopagogo, the Alara was allowed to wear a crown.

Ruling Houses

Ilara-Mokin has two royal houses, Agbekorun and Afunbiokin ( houses, whom were originally one royal dynasty before being split by the descendants of Alara Agbekorun, Iyata I and Alara Afunbiokin, Agbesa I, who were likely brothers. The Kingship thus alternates between the two houses. The current monarch is a member of the Agbekorun House, and is a direct descendant of Oba Agbekorun.

Accession Process

A council of 9 or 12 chiefs called the Kingmakers, "Afọbajẹ," headed by the Lisa of Ilara-Mokin, have the traditional power to enthrone the king, with the aid of the Ifa. The Lisa or another Chief Ifa priest often performs the Ifa rituals needed to consult the god Ọ̀rúnmìlà regarding who was the best candidate to become King. The royal house that is due to rule presents a series of princes who become candidates to the throne. Once the Kingmakers select the King, he is put through a series of rituals based on the Ìṣẹ̀ṣe religion of the Yoruba people, before he is presented to the people and crowned.

Today

His Royal Highness, Oba Abiodun Aderemi Adefehinti is the king of Ilara-Mokin, he ascended the throne on 17 July 1998.

List of Alaras

See also
Nigerian traditional rulers
 Timeline of Ilara-Mokin

References

Royal titles
Yoruba history
Nigerian traditional rulers
Yoruba royal titles